366th may refer to:

366th Bombardment Squadron, inactive United States Air Force unit
366th Division (IDF), also known as the "Path of Fire" Division, a reserve armored division of the IDF
366th Fighter Squadron, inactive United States Air Force unit
366th Fighter Wing, 366th Fighter-Bomber (later, 366th Operations), in the United States Air Force Air Combat Command
366th Infantry Regiment (United States), African American (segregated) unit of the United States Army, served with distinction in both World Wars
366th Motor Rifle Regiment or 7th Guards Cavalry Corps of the Soviet Union's Red Army was a cavalry corps active during the Second World War
366th Operations Group, the flying component of the 366th Fighter Wing, assigned to the United States Air Force Air Combat Command

See also
366 (number)
366, the year 366 (CCCLXVI) of the Julian calendar
366 BC